Maximiliano Daniel Luayza Koot (born 15 April 2002) is an Argentine professional footballer who plays as an attacking midfielder for Trasandino in the Segunda División Profesional de Chile.

Career
Luayza Koot spent the early years of his career with Deportivo San Vicente, before later moving on to the ranks of Lanús in 2008. In 2017, Defensa y Justicia signed him. He remained in their academy for three years, prior to his promotion into the first-team squad in 2020 under manager Hernán Crespo. After going unused on the substitute's bench for a Copa Libertadores win over Delfín and a Copa de la Liga Profesional defeat to Central Córdoba, Luayza Koot made his senior debut in the latter competition on 6 December 2020 during a 1–0 away loss to Independiente; after replacing Nicolás Leguizamón at the interval.

In July 2022 he moved to Chile and joined Trasandino in the Segunda División Profesional de Chile.

Personal life
Luayza Koot's cousin, Nicolás, also came through the Defensa y Justicia youth system.

Career statistics
.

Notes

References

External links

2002 births
Living people
People from San Vicente Partido
Argentine people of Dutch descent
Argentine footballers
Argentine expatriate footballers
Association football midfielders
Argentine Primera División players
Defensa y Justicia footballers
Segunda División Profesional de Chile players
Trasandino footballers
Argentine expatriate sportspeople in Chile
Expatriate footballers in Chile
Sportspeople from Buenos Aires Province